Darren David Millar (born 1976) is a British politician who has served as the Member of the Senedd (MS) for Clwyd West since 2007. He is a member of the Welsh Conservatives.

Political career
From 2000 to 2001, Millar was mayor of the township of Towyn and Kinmel Bay. He was also a member of Conwy County Borough Council, the North Wales Police Authority and the North Wales Fire and Rescue Service.

In the 2003 Senedd election, he stood as the Conservative candidate for the Vale of Clwyd.

In the 2007 election, Millar was elected to the Clwyd West seat, unseating the incumbent Labour MS, Alun Pugh. Pugh was the only Cabinet Minister to be defeated in the election.

Millar was re-elected in the 2011, 2016 and 2021 elections.

He is a former Shadow Minister for the Environment and Planning, a former Shadow Minister for Communities and Local Government and also a former Shadow Minister for Economy and Transport. He is a former member of the Senedd's Sustainability Committee, and a former Chair of the Senedd's Health, Well-being and Local Government Committee.

In November 2010 Millar was elected as Chair of the Senedd's Public Accounts Committee. Millar also Chairs the Cross Party Group on Faith, and the Cross Party Group on the Armed Forces and Cadets, both of which he is a founder member.

He was one of four Conservative MSs (along with Andrew RT Davies, Janet Finch-Saunders and Mark Isherwood) to vote for Brexit in the 2016 Brexit referendum.

Millar has been drawn to table a Members Bill on three occasions.

In January 2021 the Senedd Commission was investigating Millar for an alleged breach of COVID-19 regulations. He resigned from his frontbench role as chief whip on 23 January 2021 after the leader Paul Davies resigned on the same day.

Both Millar and Davies were later cleared of any wrongdoing by South Wales Police, Cardiff City Council, the Senedd Commission and the Senedd Standards of Conduct Committee. 

In April 2022 a report published by the Senedd Standards Committee found that no laws or standards of conduct had been breached.

Personal life
Millar lives in the Kinmel Bay area with his wife and two children. He enjoys reading and history, and attends Festival Church.

Millar is a citizen of both the United Kingdom and the Republic of Ireland and has held dual citizenship for decades.

References

External links
 Darren Millar MS (Darren Millar official website – English language)
 Darren Millar AS (Darren Millar official website – Welsh language)
 Senedd Cymru: Members Profile
 Welsh Conservatives: Profile

1976 births
Living people
Conservative Party members of the Senedd
Mayors of places in Wales
Wales AMs 2007–2011
Wales AMs 2011–2016
Wales MSs 2016–2021
Wales MSs 2021–2026
Welsh Conservative councillors